In telecommunication, reference noise is the magnitude of circuit noise chosen as a reference for measurement.  

Many different levels with a number of different weightings are in current use, and care must be taken to ensure that the proper parameters are stated. 

Specific ones include: dBa, dBa(F1A), dBa(HA1), dBa0, dBm, dBm(psoph), dBm0, dBrn, dBrnC, dBrnC0, dBrn(f1-f2), dBrn(144-line), dBx.

References

Noise (electronics)
Communication circuits
Telecommunications techniques